William Alvin Pittenger (December 29, 1885 – November 26, 1951) was a United States Representative from Minnesota's 8th congressional district.  He was born on a farm near Crawfordsville, Montgomery County, Indiana and attended rural schools. Pittenger graduated from Wabash College, Crawfordsville, Indiana, in 1909, and from Harvard Law School in 1912.  He was admitted to the bar in 1912 and opened a law practice in Duluth, Minnesota.

Pittenger served as a member of the Minnesota House of Representatives from 1917 to 1920, and was elected as a Republican to the 71st and 72nd congresses, serving from March 4, 1929 until March 3, 1933.  He ran unsuccessfully for reelection in 1932 and resumed his practice of law in Duluth, Minnesota.  He was again elected to the 74th congress, in which he served from January 3, 1935 until January 3, 1937, but was defeated in his bid for reelection to the 75th Congress in 1936.  He served again in the 76th, 77th, 78th, and 79th Congresses, from January 3, 1939 until January 3, 1947.  In 1946 he lost his bid for re-election to the 80th Congress. He made one more attempt in 1950 to reclaim his old House seat, but was defeated 63% to 37%.

After his retirement from politics, Pittenger again resumed the practice of law, and died in Duluth, Minnesota, on November 26, 1951.  He is buried in Forest Hill Cemetery.

References
Minnesota Legislators Past and Present
Congressional Biography

Wabash College alumni
Harvard Law School alumni
Republican Party members of the Minnesota House of Representatives
1885 births
1951 deaths
Republican Party members of the United States House of Representatives from Minnesota
20th-century American politicians